The Robert G. Turner House is located in Greer, South Carolina. The Colonial Revival style brick veneered house was designed by the prominent Greenville, South Carolina-based architect William Riddle Ward for Robert Gibbs Turner and Turner's wife, Mary. Ward also designed the one-story brick veneered garage to match the house.

References

National Register of Historic Places in Greenville County, South Carolina
Colonial Revival architecture in South Carolina
Houses completed in 1935
Greer, South Carolina
Houses in Greenville County, South Carolina
Houses on the National Register of Historic Places in South Carolina